The Opal Heart is an album by saxophonist David Liebman which was recorded in Australia in 1979 and originally released on the Australian label, 44 Records, before being rereleased in the US on Inner City then on CD by the German-based Enja label in 1996.

Track listing 
All compositions by David Liebman except where noted
 "Sunburst" (Ron McClure) – 9:04   
 "Port Ligat" – 7:59 
 "The Opal Hearted Aborigine" – 6:07 
 "I Concentrate on You" (Cole Porter) – 7:47  
 "Star Crossed Lovers" (Duke Ellington, Billy Strayhorn) – 4:04  
 "Down Under" (McClure) – 7:08

Personnel 
David Liebman – tenor saxophone, soprano saxophone
Mike Nock – piano
Ron McClure – bass
Ed Soph – drums

References 

 

Dave Liebman albums
1979 albums
Enja Records albums